Kristian Ruth   (born 23 July 1985)  is a Norwegian sailor. He competed at the 2008 and 2012 Summer Olympics in the Men's Laser class.

References

Norwegian male sailors (sport)
1985 births
Living people
Olympic sailors of Norway
Sailors at the 2008 Summer Olympics – Laser
Sailors at the 2012 Summer Olympics – Laser
Sailors at the 2016 Summer Olympics – Laser